Jason Andrew Bent (born March 8, 1977) is a Canadian former soccer player and current assistant coach for LA Galaxy. A midfielder, he played in Major League Soccer for the Colorado Rapids, 2. Bundesliga for FSV Zwickau and the Football League for Plymouth Argyle. Bent won 32 caps for Canada at full international level.

Club career
After playing college soccer for the University of Maryland, Bent played a season with FSV Zwickau, before moving to Colorado Rapids in MLS. During his time with the Rapids he helped the Rapids reach the finals in the US Open Cup.

Bent was really close to signing a long-term contract with FC Copenhagen in 2001. But later in the year Bent signed with Plymouth Argyle helping the team win the English Third Division Championship in 2002, and the English Second Division Championship in 2004.

International career
Bent played at the 1993 FIFA U-17 World Championship in Japan, in a team alongside Paul Stalteri and Jeff Clarke. He then also played at the 1997 FIFA World Youth Championship in Malaysia, again with Stalteri and Clarke.

He made his senior his debut for Canada in an October 1997 World Cup qualification match against Mexico. He earned a total of 32 caps, scoring no goals. He represented Canada in 11 FIFA World Cup qualification matches and played at the 2001 Confederations Cup.

He was a member of the 2000 CONCACAF Gold Cup winning squad, but did not play because of injury. In 2002, Bent also scored a decisive penalty kick against Martinique in the 2002 Gold Cup quarter-finals where Canada finished in third place.

His final international was a November 2003 friendly match against Republic of Ireland, in which Bent suffered a serious knee injury. For two full years he spent every day in physiotherapy, but nothing could be done to save his career. Bent announced his official retirement on March 23, 2006, after failing to recover from knee injuries.

Coaching career
Jason started his managerial career in 2008 as assistant coach of TFC Academy, after the academy's inaugural season in the Canadian Soccer League Bent took over as the head coach of the U-18 program. He served as the academy's U-18 manager until 2011 with two players, Doneil Henry and Nicholas Lindsay graduating into Toronto FC first team. On February 22, 2011, it was announced that Bent would become assistant coach to the Toronto FC first team joining newly appointed manager Aron Winter and first assistant Bob de Klerk. Jason was named the new head coach of Toronto FC's new USL Pro team on November 20, 2014.

In 2018, he returned to the first team to serve once more as an assistant coach to Greg Vanney. In 2021, he was named an assistant coach for the third time under Greg Vanney this time with the LA Galaxy.

Coaching record

Honours
Plymouth Argyle
Football League Third Division: 2001–02
Football League Second Division: 2003–04

References

External links
 Jason Bent at fussballportal.de 
 
 
 

1977 births
Living people
Canadian soccer coaches
Canadian soccer players
Soccer players from Toronto
Sportspeople from Scarborough, Toronto
Canada men's international soccer players
Association football midfielders
FSV Zwickau players
Colorado Rapids players
Plymouth Argyle F.C. players
Major League Soccer players
2. Bundesliga players
English Football League players
2001 FIFA Confederations Cup players
2002 CONCACAF Gold Cup players
2003 CONCACAF Gold Cup players
Black Canadian soccer players
Canada men's youth international soccer players
Canada men's under-23 international soccer players
Association football coaches
Toronto FC non-playing staff
Toronto FC II
Canadian Soccer League (1998–present) managers
Canadian expatriate soccer players
Canadian expatriate sportspeople in the United States
Expatriate soccer players in the United States
Canadian expatriate sportspeople in Germany
Expatriate footballers in Germany
Canadian expatriate sportspeople in England
Expatriate footballers in England